The University of Arkansas–Fort Smith (UAFS) is a 4-year, public university in Fort Smith, Arkansas. Part of the University of Arkansas System, UAFS is the sixth-largest university in Arkansas with a fall 2020 enrollment of approximately 6,500 students.

The university campus occupies  of an arboretum that has 1,182 GPS-inventoried trees representing 81 species. It offers 62 graduate, bachelor, and associate degrees, 50 technical and proficiency certificates, and nearly 30 minors.

In late 2021, UAFS opened its Center for Economic Development (CED) at the Bakery District in downtown Fort Smith. The CED consists of three distinct offices (the Center for Professional and Business Development, the Family Enterprise Center, and the Arkansas Small Business and Technology Development Center), which offer consulting and training services to business and industry professionals.

UAFS's athletic teams, the Lady Lions and Lions, compete in NCAA Division II as members of the Lone Star Conference (LSC) with five women's teams and five men's teams across 10 sports.

History 

The University of Arkansas–Fort Smith was established in 1928 as an extension of the public school system in Fort Smith, Arkansas, with the superintendent, James William Ramsey, acting as the college president and the high school principal as dean. Known originally as Fort Smith Junior College, the institution operated within the Fort Smith public school system until 1950, when the school was incorporated as a private, nonprofit institution with its own governing board. In September 1952, the college moved from borrowed facilities in the high school to its current site, initially occupying .

During the private college era, enrollment increased, as did course offerings, the number of faculty, and facilities. A vocational-technical division was added in 1960. During this period, the college began developing the programs and character of a comprehensive community college—a new concept in Arkansas and across the nation.

In the fall of 1965, the Sebastian County electorate approved the creation of the Sebastian County Community Junior College District, along with a tax levy on the real and personal property of the county. The governor appointed a Board of Trustees, and the school again became a public institution.

In 1966, the institution's name was changed from Fort Smith Junior College to Westark Junior College, and in 1972, to Westark Community College, indicating the larger area to be served and reflecting the more comprehensive mission.

Throughout the 1980s and early 1990s, the college developed and made changes within the context of its mission as a two-year institution. A significant development in 1989 was the establishment of a University Center. Five state universities partnered with the institution to offer six bachelor's and seven master's degree programs on campus. Between 1989 and 2002, 1,788 students graduated with bachelor's degrees through the University Center.

In 1997, the Arkansas Legislature passed an act granting Westark the authority to offer in its own right up to nine applied bachelor's degrees, developed in response to identified needs of the industries in the area served.

The name of the college was changed yet again in February 1998 to Westark College, more accurately portraying the role and scope of the institution.

On December 15, 2000, the Board of Trustees of Westark College entered into an agreement with the Board of Trustees of the University of Arkansas to merge with the University of Arkansas System as a four-year institution. In 2001, the Sebastian County electorate voted to support the merger. A formal request to change affiliation status to that of a bachelor's degree-granting institution under the name of the University of Arkansas–Fort Smith was submitted to the Higher Learning Commission in August 2001 and approved by the Institutional Actions Council on November 19, 2001.

The merger, which became official on January 1, 2002, endorsed the concept of UAFS as a unique university, one that offers applied and traditional baccalaureate degree programs, one- and two-year associate and technical programs, and non-credit business and industry training programs.

In 2006 Arkansas state senator David Bisbee attempted to review the University of Arkansas–Fort Smith's legal status. Bisbee claimed he wanted to make sure the institution was in good legal standing.

Colleges 

In April 2021, UAFS Chancellor Terisa Riley announced a reorganization of the university's structure which consolidated its colleges from five to three. The three colleges are: 
 The College of Arts and Sciences 
 The College of Business and Industry
 The College of Health, Education, and Human Sciences (Includes Carolyn McKelvey School of Nursing and School of Education)

Campus

Windgate Art & Design  
Windgate Art & Design is a state-of-the-art visual arts facility located on the UAFS campus that opened in fall 2015. The 58,000 square foot building was constructed following a $15.5 million gift to the university from the Windgate Charitable Foundation. The building includes a letterpress and printmaking studio, a film theater, a videography and photography studio, and numerous classrooms and professional-quality artistic spaces.

Recreation and Wellness Center  
The Recreation and Wellness Center, more commonly known as the RAWC, is a 47,000 square foot facility that offers multiple facilities, including basketball and volleyball courts, an expanded fitness area with new equipment, a three-lane running track, and a rock climbing wall. The building was opened in fall 2016.

Art galleries 
The university houses three art galleries that are free and open to the public. The Mary Tinnin Jaye Gallery and the Sally Boreham Gallery are permanent displays that include works rendered in traditional media as well as digital prints and photographs. The Smith-Pendergraft Campus Center's Traveling Art Gallery features rotating exhibits.

Arboretum 
The university has made the entire campus an arboretum, with more than 69 species of trees mapped out by GPS technology.

The campus grounds have won numerous awards for landscaping and horticulture.

Awards
 The Ball Horticultural Company Floral Displays Champion–America in Bloom 2005 (AIB)
 Green Star Grand Award for the Best Maintained Landscape in the Nation–School or University Category–Professional Grounds Management Society 2003 (PGMS)
 Distinguished Service Award–Keep Arkansas Beautiful 2002 (KAB)

Reynolds Bell Tower 

The Donald W. Reynolds Bell Tower was commissioned on May 21, 1993, and dedicated on September 22, 1995. It is the largest free-standing belfry in the South Central United States  and houses the largest installation of cast bronze bells on a college campus between Texas A&M and the University of Nebraska. At specific hours throughout the day, prerecorded and live carols are played throughout campus by the giant brass carillon of the tower. The Reynolds Bell Tower stands at the head of the campus green.

Numa 

In front of the Stubblefield Center, home of the Lions basketball and volleyball teams, is the newly erected Numa statue. The sculpture was unveiled on April 28, 2010, and is the largest statue of a leaping lion in the world.

Boreham Library 
Boreham Library gives students access to computers, printed and electronic books, online databases, and periodicals. The 70,000 square foot facility also includes a 24-hour study zone, fully equipped meeting and classrooms, and the Babb Center for Student Professional Development.

Pendergraft Health Sciences Center
Opened in November 2004, the Pendergraft Health Sciences Center includes classrooms and state-of-the-art facilities for theoretical and practical learning for students in the dental hygiene, nursing, and imaging sciences programs, as well as the student health, dental, and counseling clinics.

Baldor Technology Center
The Baldor Technology Center includes various labs and workshops for hands-on experience in courses such as automotive technology, animation technology, electronics, robotics, and unmanned aerial systems.

Smith Pendergraft Campus Center
The Smith-Pendergraft Campus Center is named for donors Fred W. Smith and Ross Pendergraft. The second floor houses some of the most important student services, including Admissions, Advisement, Financial Aid, the Registrar's Office, and the Cashier's Office. The first floor is the hub of campus life. The first floor houses the campus bookstore, Box Office, and Student Activities Office. The food court offers a wide selection of grab-and-go snacks, as well as Chick-Fil-A, Two-12, and a full-service Starbucks. The Campus Center also has several student lounge areas, professional meeting rooms, a ballroom, and an art gallery.

Athletics 

UAFS athletic teams are known as the Lions. The university competes in a variety of collegiate athletics as a member of the National Collegiate Athletic Association (NCAA) at the Division II level. The university is a member of the Lone Star Conference and sponsors men's sports, including: baseball, basketball, cross country, golf and tennis; women's sports, including: basketball, cross country, golf, tennis, and volleyball.

Student life

Student housing 

The Sebastian Commons Apartments provide upperclassmen with an on-campus housing community. The Commons has a 480-bed occupancy. The rooms are fully furnished and equipped with wireless Internet access. A traditional dorm-style residence hall with on-site dining, the Lion's Den, opened in August 2010. In the fall of 2011, the university set aside two buildings in the Sebastian Commons for Greek housing.

Greek life 
Greek Life at the University of Arkansas–Fort Smith began in the Spring of 2007. The university now has seven Greek Organizations including four IFC Fraternities and three National Panhellenic Sororities. 

Fraternities:
 Kappa Alpha Order
 Sigma Nu
 Kappa Sigma
 Pi Kappa Phi

Sororities:
 Delta Gamma
 Gamma Phi Beta
 Alpha Omicron Pi

Notable alumni
Jeff McKnight, major league baseball player
Sonny Weems, former member of the Phoenix Suns

References

External links

University of Arkansas–Fort Smith Athletics

 01
Fort Smith
University of Arkansas Fort Smith
Education in Sebastian County, Arkansas
1928 establishments in Arkansas
Arkansas-Fort Smith, University of
Tourist attractions in Sebastian County, Arkansas
University of Arkansas-Fort Smith[edit